Andrus Rõuk (born 28 September 1957, in Tallinn) is an Estonian artist and poet.

In 1981, in the 9th number of the literary journal Looming his poem "Silmades taevas ja meri" ("In the eyes sky and sea") appeared. It is an acrostic: the first letters of the verses read  "SINIMUSTVALGE" ("blue-black-white"), the colours of the national flag of Estonia (at a time when Estonia was occupied and the use of national flag was forbidden; the Soviet flag of Estonia was mostly red with some blue and white). For this he was excluded from the Estonian State Institute of Arts (currently Estonian Academy of Arts).

References

1957 births
Living people
20th-century Estonian male artists
21st-century Estonian male artists
Estonian male poets
Artists from Tallinn
Writers from Tallinn
20th-century Estonian poets
21st-century Estonian poets
Recipients of the Order of the White Star, 4th Class